BTV World is a Bangladeshi Bengali-language satellite and cable television channel owned by the state-owned Bangladesh Television. It began operations on 11 April 2004 via the AsiaSat 3 satellite. It simulcasts the broadcasts of BTV Dhaka for most of its schedule, which then simulcasts BTV World's broadcasts during the off-air hours of its terrestrial feed.

BTV World broadcasts worldwide from the BTV Bhaban in Rampura, Dhaka. It was also announced to be converted into an entertainment channel, with a different schedule compared to BTV Dhaka. BTV World is a free-to-air television channel.

History 
Bangladesh Television originally planned to commence broadcasts on satellite television on 25 December 2003, coinciding its 39th anniversary, but this was delayed due to technical difficulties. It officially began broadcasting via satellite on 11 April 2004, with the launch of BTV World. It broadcast via the Hong Kong-based AsiaSat 3, using Band C of the satellite, covering Oceania, Asia, and Europe. BTV World also planned to produce English-language programming for international audiences.

On 5 November 2012, BTV Dhaka began broadcasting on a full-day basis daily via satellite television and, during off-air hours of its terrestrial feed, began simulcasting BTV World's transmissions. As of 2017, BTV World is broadcast in 49 countries worldwide via AsiaSat 7, including the entirety of the continent of Asia. In 2018, BTV World began broadcasting using the Bangabandhu-1 satellite.

On 2 September 2019, BTV World is made available on India's DD Free Dish. It also began broadcasting in the Middle East and North Africa on 10 April 2020. In May 2021, BTV World, along with its sisters, is made available for streaming worldwide via the BTV app. As BTV was airing the T20 World Cup, the popular Ityadi program, normally broadcast on both channels, was solely broadcast on BTV World on 29 October 2021. In May 2022, the Government of Bangladesh ordered the broadcast of BTV World, along with its sisters, in airports across the country.

Programming

References 

Bangladesh Television
Public television in Bangladesh
2004 establishments in Bangladesh
Television channels and stations established in 2004
Television in Bangladesh
Mass media in Dhaka
Television channels in Bangladesh